Eight Mile Creek is a rural locality in the Shire of Burdekin, Queensland, Australia.

History 
The locality was named and bounded on 23 February 2001.

Geography
The Burdekin River forms the southern part of the eastern boundary, while Expedition Pass Creek forms the northern boundary. Eight Mile Creek (the watercourse) forms the northern part of the eastern boundary until it joins Expedition Pass Creek on its way to the Burdekin.

References 

Shire of Burdekin
Localities in Queensland